Ippei is a masculine Japanese given name. Notable people with the name include:

, Japanese politician
, Japanese badminton player
, Japanese footballer
, Japanese manga artist and anime producer
, Japanese interpreter for the Los Angeles Angels
, Japanese footballer
, Japanese anthropologist
, Russian-Japanese footballer
, Japanese footballer
, Japanese swimmer

Japanese masculine given names